The Sainik Schools are a system of schools in India established and managed by the Sainik Schools Society under Ministry of Defence (MoD). They were conceived in 1961 by V. K. Krishna Menon, the then Defence Minister of India, to rectify the regional and class imbalance amongst the Officer cadre of the Indian Military, and to prepare students mentally and physically for entry into the National Defence Academy (NDA) and Indian Naval Academy (INA). Sainik Schools, along with 1 RIMC and 5 RMS (Rashtriya Military Schools), contribute 25% to 30% officer cadets to NDA and INA. As of 2021, there were 33 Sainik Schools, and MoD will establish 100 more boarding Sainik Schools in public–private partnership (PPP) mode.

MoD run Sainik Schools as joint venture with the respective state governments. MoD provides annual funding, and serving officers in the key roles such as Principal. State governments provide the land, infrastructure, and other teaching and administrative employees.

Sainik Schools follow the "CBSE Plus" by using CBSE curriculum while additionally aiming to prepare children for entry into NDA and INA. Admission to Sainik Schools is granted from 6th class. The reservation policy caters for SC/ST, domicile of the respective states and the wards of Armed Forces employees and ex-servicemen.

History

The inspiration for setting up the Sainik Schools came from the Royal Indian Military College (RIMC) and Royal Indian Military Schools (now called Rashtriya Military School or RMS) which have given India many service chiefs. 1 RIMC and 5 RMS were established by the government after the World War I to Indianise the British Colonial Military in India by providing western style education with the aim to prepare the potential pool of future military officers. RIMC was established in 1922. Five RMS were established, namely Chail Military School in 1922, Ajmer Military School in 1930, Belgaum Military School in 1945, Bangalore Military School in 1946 and Dholpur Military School in 1962. First Sainik School came up in 1961. Additionally, there are several private military schools, Maharashtra has highest number of those. Oldest private military school is Bhonsala Military School, which was established in 1937.

Although Sainik School, Lucknow, established in 1960 was the first Sainik School, is not under the Sainik School Society, but rather under Uttar Pradesh Sainik Schools Society, which is registered under the Indian Societies Registration Act (1860). 

In 2008, in his Union Budget the Finance minister, P Chidambaram, allocated 2 crore to each of the 25 Sainik schools, to counter rising attrition in the defence forces, especially at the officer level.

Sainik schools are ordinary citizen's public school where deserving students get high-quality education irrespective of their income or class background. Seats are reserved for children of SC/ST and serving/retired defence personnel.

The objective of the Sainik Schools is to prepare the students to lead as officers in the Defence Services of the country. The schools select bright and promising students through an All India Sainik School Entrance Examination (AISSEE) and focus on moulding their overall personality with emphasis on extracurricular activities.

Sainik schools resources allow cadets to develop their skills in sports, academics and other extracurricular activities. Infrastructure in Sainik Schools include running tracks, cross-country tracks, indoor games, parade grounds, boxing rings, firing ranges, canoeing clubs, horse riding clubs, mountaineering clubs, trekking and hiking club, obstacles courses, football, hockey and cricket fields, as well as volleyball and basketball courts. Cadets also become a part of NCC. A cadet who completes their 12th standard usually possess a NCC B certificate.

Cadets are assigned to houses. They are classified as sub-juniors, juniors and seniors respectively depending upon their class of study. Cadets compete in sports, physical training, academics, cross country, drill and various other competitions to win their house trophy.

Sainik Schools Society

The Sainik Schools Society is an organisation under the Ministry of Defence. The Chief Executive Body of the Sainik Schools Society is a Board of Governors functioning under the Chairmanship of the Defence Minister. For exercising closer control and supervision over the affairs of Sainik Schools there is an Executive Committee under the Chairmanship of Defence Secretary. The day-to-day work of the Society is managed by JS (Trg) & Hony Secretary who is assisted by Inspecting Officers, DS (Trg), Under Secretary, Sainik Schools Society (Sainik School Cell). The staff for the cell is provided by the MoD. The local administration of the school is looked after by a Local Board of Administration whose Chairman is the GoC-in-C of the concerned Command where the Sainik School is located.

Sainik Schools

Existing Sainik Schools under Sainik Schools Society, MOD

Sainik School, Manasbal

Uttar Pradesh - Sainik School, Lucknow 
Sainik School Lucknow was established in July 1960. The only one of the Sainik Schools to be administered by the State Government, the alumni of which, Captain Manoj Pandey, posthumously received Param Veer Chakra. It was the first Sainik School in the country, and was followed by the setting up of other Sainik Schools, under the Ministry of Defence, Government of India, on the same lines. The education in this school is subsidised by the Government of Uttar Pradesh. It is a residential English medium school affiliated to CBSE Board.

The school is run by the Uttar Pradesh Sainik Schools Society, which is registered under the Indian Societies Registration Act (1860). It is the only Sainik School which is completely financed and managed by the State Government.

Proposed Sainik Schools
Sainik School, Jaipur, Rajasthan
Sainik School, Godda, Jharkhand
 Sainik School, Alwar, Rajasthan
 Sainik School, Gorakhpur, Uttar Pradesh
 Sainik School, Matanhail at Matanhail in Jhajjar district was announced by the Haryana government in 2018. Foundation stone was laid in 2003 by the then Defence Minister George Fernandes, but no progress was made. In 2018, with the efforts of Haryana Finance Minister, Captain Abhimanyu, the BJP Government of Haryana agreed to provide funds and 100 acre land in Matanhail and Rudiyawas villages for the establishment of this school. With this Haryana will be only state in India with 3 sainik schools.
 Sainik School, Pali, Rajasthan
Sainik School, Bilaspur, Chhattisgarh
Sainik School, Mumbai, Maharashtra
 Sainik School, Raipur, Chhattisgarh
 Sainik School Dausa, Rajasthan
 Sainik School Jabalpur, Madhya Pradesh
 Sainik School Udaipur, Rajasthan
 Sainik School, Kashmir
 Sainik School, Leh
 Sainik School, Port Blair
 Sainik School, Silvassa Dadra and Nagar Haveli and daman & Diu

Finance Minister Nirmala Sitharaman announced during Budget 2021 that 100 new Sainik schools will be set up across the country in partnership with private schools and NGOs.

17. Sainik School, Gurdaspur Punjab

See also 
 Cadet college, similar military educational institutions system in other nations. 
 National Cadet Corps (India) (NCC)
 National Police Cadet Corps (NPCC)
 National Service Scheme (NSS)
 Rashtriya Indian Military College (RIMC)
 Rashtriya Military Schools (RMS)

References

External links

 Sainik Schools Society
 Home of Saikapians living overseas
 Sainik School Amaravathinagar Alumni Association
 Old Boys of Sainik School Association
 Old Boys of Balachadi Sainik School Association
 Old Boys of Sainik School Kazhakoottam
 Home of Saikapians Living Overseas
 Sainik School Sujanpur Tira Alumni website
 Sainik School Tilaiya Old Boys Association
 Old Boys Association of Sainik School, Bijapur
  Sainik School Goalpara, Assam Old Boys Association Forum

Military education and training in India
Sainik schools
Military high schools
Central Board of Secondary Education
Military schools in India
1961 establishments in India
Educational institutions established in 1961